Greg Rusedski and Fabrice Santoro were the defending champions, but were eliminated in the round robin.

Lleyton Hewitt and Mark Philippoussis defeated Justin Gimelstob and Ross Hutchins in the final, 6–3, 6–3 to win the gentlemen's invitation doubles tennis title at the 2017 Wimbledon Championships.

Draw

Final

Group A
Standings are determined by: 1. number of wins; 2. number of matches; 3. in two-players-ties, head-to-head records; 4. in three-players-ties, percentage of sets won, or of games won; 5. steering-committee decision.

Group B
Standings are determined by: 1. number of wins; 2. number of matches; 3. in two-players-ties, head-to-head records; 4. in three-players-ties, percentage of sets won, or of games won; 5. steering-committee decision.

References
Gentlemen's Invitation Doubles

Men's Invitation Doubles